Sir James Lawrence Munby (born 27 July 1948) is a retired English judge who was President of the Family Division of the High Court of England and Wales. He was replaced by Sir Andrew McFarlane on reaching the mandatory retirement age.

Early life
Munby was born on 27 July 1948. He was educated at Magdalen College School, Oxford and Wadham College, Oxford, where he is an Honorary Fellow.  He was also an Eldon Scholarship winner.

Legal career
Munby was called to the bar at Middle Temple in 1971 and practised as a barrister at New Square Chambers. He was appointed Queen's Counsel in 1988 and as a High Court Judge on 2 October 2000, assigned to the Family Division and authorised to sit in the Administrative Court.

Munby was appointed as Chairman of the Law Commission on 1 August 2009, replacing Lord Justice Etherton. 

On 12 October of that year, he was appointed a Lord Justice of Appeal, receiving the customary appointment to the Privy Council. His term as Chairman of the Law Commission expired in August 2012. On 11 January 2013, he succeeded Sir Nicholas Wall as President of the Family Division.

Munby was the presiding judge when Charles Spencer, 9th Earl Spencer divorced his second wife, Carolyn Freud. The Earl's  barrister Nicholas Mostyn advised his client that the case could be heard in private, which Munby rejected. The Earl was upset at the final settlement and unsuccessfully sued Mostyn.

In September 2015, Munby was the Presiding Judge in the Permission to Appeal hearing for the judgment of Deputy District Judge Michele O'Leary in the April 2015 case of  Adler vs Broulidakis, finding that O'Leary's judgement should be appealed.

Munby instituted procedural changes which from January 2016 led to hearings in the Court of Protection being open to the public, save where a judge decides otherwise.

References

1948 births
Living people
People educated at Magdalen College School, Oxford
Alumni of Wadham College, Oxford
English King's Counsel
Family Division judges
Knights Bachelor
Lords Justices of Appeal
Members of the Privy Council of the United Kingdom
Presidents of the Family Division